New Zealand competed at the 1932 Summer Olympics in Los Angeles, United States. The team of 21 was New Zealand's largest to date and comprised 11 rowers, six athletes, three boxers, and one cyclist. The officials were manager Philip Rundle of Dunedin, boxing and athletic coach W. J. Heenan, and rowing coach Clarrie Healey.

An innovation was the daily one-hour radio report on the Olympics for New Zealand and Australia by the film actress from New Zealand, Nola Luxford.

Medallists

Athletics

Boxing

Cycling

Rowing

In 1932, seven rowing events were held, and New Zealand entered three boats: a coxless pair, a coxed four, and a coxed eight. The competition was for men only; women would first row at the 1976 Summer Olympics. The eight included the first two Māori Olympians, Jack Macdonald and Lawrence Woodgate-Jackson.

References

Official Olympic Reports
International Olympic Committee results database

Nations at the 1932 Summer Olympics
1932
Summer Olympics